Stefano Patuanelli (born 8 June 1974) is an Italian politician and civil engineer, member of the Five Star Movement. On 5 September 2019 he was appointed Minister of Economic Development in the Conte II Cabinet.

References 

Living people
1974 births
Five Star Movement politicians
Politicians from Trieste
Conte II Cabinet
Draghi Cabinet
University of Trieste alumni
Government ministers of Italy
Senators of Legislature XVIII of Italy
Italian civil engineers
20th-century Italian engineers
21st-century Italian engineers
Agriculture ministers of Italy